This is a list of San Jose Sharks award winners.

League awards

Team trophies

Individual awards

All-Stars

NHL first and second team All-Stars
The NHL first and second team All-Stars are the top players at each position as voted on by the Professional Hockey Writers' Association.

NHL All-Rookie Team
The NHL All-Rookie Team consists of the top rookies at each position as voted on by the Professional Hockey Writers' Association.

All-Star Game selections
The National Hockey League All-Star Game is a mid-season exhibition game held annually between many of the top players of each season. Twenty-two All-Star Games have been held since the San Jose Sharks entered the league in 1991, with at least one player chosen to represent the Sharks in each year except 1998. The All-Star game has not been held in various years: 1979 and 1987 due to the 1979 Challenge Cup and Rendez-vous '87 series between the NHL and the Soviet national team, respectively, 1995, 2005, and 2013 as a result of labor stoppages, 2006, 2010, and 2014 because of the Winter Olympic Games, and 2021 as a result of the COVID-19 pandemic. San Jose has hosted two of the games. The 47th and 64th took place at the SAP Center at San Jose.

 Selected by fan vote
 Selected by Commissioner

Career achievements

Hockey Hall of Fame
The following is a list of San Jose Sharks who have been enshrined in the Hockey Hall of Fame.

Lester Patrick Trophy
The Lester Patrick Trophy has been presented by the National Hockey League and USA Hockey since 1966 to honor a recipient's contribution to ice hockey in the United States. This list includes all personnel who have ever been employed by the San Jose Sharks in any capacity and have also received the Lester Patrick Trophy.

United States Hockey Hall of Fame

Retired numbers

The San Jose Sharks have retired one of their jersey numbers. Out of circulation is the number 99 which was retired league-wide for Wayne Gretzky on February 6, 2000. Gretzky did not play for the Sharks during his 20-year NHL career and no Sharks player had ever worn the number 99 prior to its retirement.

Team awards

Media Good Guy
The Media Good Guy is an annual award voted on by the Bay Area media given to the player who handles his media responsibilities with cooperation, honesty, and thoughtfulness, and answers the bell no matter the outcome or situation.

Sharks Fan Favorite Award
The Sharks Fan Favorite Award is an annual award voted on by Sharks fans.

Sharks Player of the Year
The Sharks Player of the Year is an annual award given to the player "contributing most to the success of the Sharks" during the regular season as determined by Bay Area media.

Sharks Rookie of the Year
The Sharks Rookie of the Year is an annual award given to the team's best rookie as determined by Bay Area media.

Three Stars of the Year
The Three Stars of the Year is an annual award given to the player who earns the most points from Star of the game selections throughout the regular season.

See also
List of National Hockey League awards

References

San Jose Sharks
award